Jagdambika Pal is an Indian politician. He was also a member of 15th Lok Sabha & 16th Lok Sabha and was a member of Indian National Congress, until he resigned on 7 March 2014.

Political career
He was a member of Indian National Congress. He parted from the Indian National Congress to join All India Indira Congress (Tiwari) of N. D. Tiwari but in 1997, he formed Akhil Bharatiya Loktantrik Congress along with Naresh Agarwal, Rajeev Shukla and Shyam Sunder Sharma and Bacha Pathak and became minister of transport in Kalyan Singh government.

Later, Jagdambika Pal became the president of the Uttar Pradesh state unit of the Indian National Congress.

In 2009 he was elected to the 15th Lok Sabha from Domariyaganj Lok Sabha constituency in Siddharthnagar district, Uttar Pradesh. 
 
On 3 July 2011, Jagdambika Pal and other members of Lok Sabha, lower house of the Parliament of India, opened Commemorative plaque at Mahua Dabar, where the British massacred 5,000 people during the Indian Rebellion of 1857.

Chief Minister of Uttar Pradesh
When, the Uttar Pradesh state government led by Kalyan Singh was dismissed on 21 February 1998 by Governor of Uttar Pradesh Romesh Bhandari, he became the Chief Minister. Kalyan Singh moved Allahabad High Court which termed the dismissal of government unconstitutional on 23 February 1998, thereby reinstating the Kalyan Singh government.

He holds the record for the shortest stint as Chief Minister of any state in India for just one day. He is popularly known as the "one-day chief minister". However, the legitimacy of his regime, is disputed as the Kalyan Singh government's dismissal had been declared unconstitutional by the Allahabad High Court.

Personal life
He was born in a Pal caste corner to Surya Baksha Pal and Mool Rajidevi at Bharvaliya village of Bankati Block in Basti district of Uttar Pradesh state. He founded Surya Baksha Pal Girls Inter college and Surya Baksha Pal Post Graduate Degree College at Bankati, Basti district.

Positions held
 1982-93 	Member, Uttar Pradesh Legislative Council (two terms)
 1988-1999 	Minister of State, Govt. of Uttar Pradesh
 1998          Chief Minister of Uttar Pradesh
 1993-2007 	Member, Uttar Pradesh Legislative Assembly (three terms)
 2002    	Cabinet Minister, Govt. of Uttar Pradesh
 2009  	Elected to 15th Lok Sabha (INC) from Domariyaganj Member, Committee on Energy;	Member, Committee on Petitions;	Member, Committee on Members of Parliament Local Area Development Scheme (MPLADs); Member, Committee on Chemical and Fertilizers; Member, Consultative Committee, Ministry of Housing and Urban Poverty Alleviation and Ministry of Tourism
 2014 	        Resigned from 15th Lok Sabha and Indian national Congress party
 2014 Elected to 16th Lok Sabha (BJP) from Domariyaganj.
2019 Elected to 17th Lok Sabha from Domariyaganj.

References

External links
 Chief Ministers of Uttar Pradesh
 Unconstitutional dismissal of Kalyan Singh Govt
 Allahabad High Court reinstates Kalyan Singh Govt

Indian real estate businesspeople
Financial advisors